Kerstin Martha Tidelius (14 October 1934 – 15 February 2023) was a Swedish actress.

Born in Stockholm, she worked mainly on stage with a total of about 20 film and TV appearances. Her most notable performances were Ingrid Löfgren in the long running Swedish TV series Hem till byn and a supporting role as Henrietta Vergérus, the bishop's sister, in Fanny and Alexander by Ingmar Bergman.

Tidelius was awarded the Svenska Dagbladets Thaliapris (the Thalia Acting Award) in 1966.

Tidelius died on 15 February 2023, at the age of 88.

Filmography

References

External links

Kerstin Tidelius at SFDb (Swedish Film Database) (swe)

1934 births
2023 deaths
Swedish actresses
Actresses from Stockholm